Stephen Reynolds (born 11 June 1992) is a Scottish footballer who played as a striker for St Johnstone.

Career
Reynolds was signed by St Johnstone in 2008 from youth team Gleniffer Thistle. In his first season with the club, he scored over 40 goals in the under-19 team. He made his senior debut for St Johnstone on 11 May 2009, in the 4–0 victory away at Airdrie United.

In November 2009, Reynolds was signed on a one-month emergency loan by Ayr United. He joined Ayr for a second loan spell, this time for six months, at the start of the 2010–11 season.

On 7 July 2011, Reynolds moved on loan to Scottish First Division club Raith Rovers. On 5 January 2012, he returned to St Johnstone at the end of his loan. He left St Johnstone at the end of the 2011–12 season.

References

External links

1992 births
Living people
Scottish footballers
Scottish Premier League players
Scottish Football League players
St Johnstone F.C. players
Ayr United F.C. players
Association football forwards
Greenock Morton F.C. players
Raith Rovers F.C. players
People from Rothesay, Bute
Sportspeople from Scottish islands
Sportspeople from Argyll and Bute